KPLS (1510 AM, "Positive Lifestyle Radio") is an AM radio station licensed to Littleton, Colorado, and serving the Denver metropolitan area. KPLS is owned by Radio 74 Internationale. In May 2020, the station transitioned to airing a Christian format following a transfer of ownership.

KPLS has studios and offices on South Union Boulevard in Lakewood and its transmitter is off Riverdale Road in Thornton, Colorado. KPLS is unusual in that its AM transmitter increases power at night, going from 10,000 watts to 25,000 watts. Both the day and night signals are quite directional, in a north-south pattern.

FM translator
KPLS's programming is simulcast on FM via the translator 92.9 K225CZ in Boulder. It was formerly carried by K229BS in Lakewood, Colorado; in 2019, the translator was sold to iHeartMedia, and began simulcasting KDFD on July 8, 2019.

History
On August 22, 1957, the station first signed on as KUDY. Owned by Bob Rubin from 1960 to 1965 and operated from above the theater at the Woodlawn Shopping Center, the original format was country music.

On April 1, 1960, the station changed its call sign to KMOR, and then again on December 31, 1964 to KDKO. By 1967, the station was known as "Denver's Soul Radio" due to its rhythm & blues format. It broadcast from studios on Santa Fe Road, just south of County Line Road. During its tenure in this format, KDKO, thanks to its popular multiracial disc jockeys, became a ratings success story throughout the Denver market and within the growing African-American community. A bit of notoriety would take place in 1976 when the station served as the co-sponsor of a planned Marvin Gaye concert that was to take place at the Denver Coliseum. Hours before it was to go on, a KDKO staffer told the crowd that Gaye would arrive shortly, only to learn that Gaye was at his home in Los Angeles and was sleeping. This embarrassment led to an uproar at the coliseum. The staffer was taken off the air for his safety after he used foul language at the concertgoers. Several lawsuits were filed alleging fraud and deceiving ticket buyers. Later, KDKO dabbled with disco music (even calling itself "KDisKO") but as disco started to fade, the station returned to its R&B roots.

By 1980, it was sold to a group of investors, who would later sell it to KDKO veteran DJ Jim "Dr. Daddy-O" Walker in 1989. By then, it had become more focused on the African-American community as a full-serviced outlet with a mix of music and talk shows. Unfortunately, KDKO would be hit by a series of financial problems that lead to a one-week shutdown in 1992, and tensions among staff and management. Another factor was the emergence of Rhythmic Top 40 107.5 KQKS in the 1990s and its success in targeting Denver's growing multicultural audience that included younger and female listeners, which would spell the end of KDKO, leading to its sale in March 2002 to Phillip Anschutz

Anschultz flipped the station to News/Talk as KNRC on June 26, 2002. After Anschutz's purchase of 1150 AM, and the move of KNRC's format to that frequency, 1510 AM became KCUV in 2003, and adopted an eclectic music format, which would move to 102.3 KVOQ-FM in 2005, with 1510 flipping to oldies.

The KCKK call sign and country music format started out at 104.3 FM when Jefferson-Pilot (JP) acquired the signal. Eventually, JP did away with the staff at KYGO 1600 AM and started simulcasting KCKK programming at 1600 AM. When JP pulled the plug on KCKK at 104.3 FM in favor of a smooth jazz format in September 2000, KCKK moved exclusively to 1600 AM. KCKK 1600's last day came in mid-December 2006 when Lincoln Financial Media (which purchased Jefferson Pilot) announced that the signal at 1600 AM would be flipped to become Denver's new ESPN Radio affiliate, KEPN. Then, 1510 AM, which was airing an oldies format, took the KCKK call sign and became classic country as "Real Country".

In late July 2007, 1510 AM flipped to a sports radio format, operated by Mile High Sports, a multimedia sports-marketing and publishing company based in Denver. The station featured network programming from Sporting News Radio (now SB Nation Radio) and several local hosts. The sports talk format was briefly suspended and KCKK returned to "Real Country". According to 100000watts.com, the change was due to the expiration of a local marketing agreement. The "Mile High Sports" format remained on former sister station KSXT (now KXJJ) 1570 AM in Loveland, Colorado as of August 21, 2007, and returned again to 1510 AM ten days later, on August 31.

On July 31, 2008, "Mile High Sports Radio" was announced as the new radio flagship for the Denver Nuggets, Colorado Avalanche, Colorado Mammoth, and Colorado Rapids. The station also broadcast the football and basketball programs at the Air Force Academy and syndicated National Football League games through the Sports USA Radio Network. In 2008, it broadcast most games of the Mountain West Conference men's basketball tournament. In June 2009, the station renewed its partnership with Kroenke Sports and Entertainment to remain the flagship station of the Nuggets, Avalanche, and Rapids.

In December 2013, KCKK and its translator on 93.7 FM were sold by NRC Broadcasting to Hunt Broadcasting. The purchase was consummated on March 3, 2014, at a price of $1.6 million.

On March 7, 2014, KCKK changed its format to adult hits, branded as "93.7 The Rock". The station was a low-budget operation, with the Hunt family providing the staff and most on-air talent. From 2016 to 2019, longtime Denver radio DJ Hal Moore hosted a show on KCKK, having hosted a show on the 1990s version of KCKK. Moore, not wishing to host an AM-only show, retired from radio at age 79 when Hunt Broadcasting sold the 93.7 FM translator to iHeartMedia (who converted it to a simulcast of KDFD and its new conservative talk format on July 15, 2019.

On January 7, 2020, All Access reported KCKK would be sold to Radio 74 Internationale for $600,000. A post on Radio 74's Facebook page  announced the call letters would be changed to KPLS (for Positive LifeStyle), with a proposed launch date of March 20, 2020. On May 15, 2020, the purchase by Radio 74 was consummated and the station's call sign was changed to KPLS. That day, the Radio 74 Internationale Facebook page announced that the old KCKK had shut down and that KPLS would be launching on May 22, 2020.

References

External links

Littleton, Colorado
PLS (AM)
PLS (AM)
Radio stations established in 1957
1957 establishments in Colorado
Radio 74 Internationale radio stations